A conjugate acid, within the Brønsted–Lowry acid–base theory, is a chemical compound formed when an acid donates a proton to a base—in other words, it is a base with a hydrogen ion added to it, as in the reverse reaction it loses a hydrogen ion. On the other hand, a conjugate base is what is left over after an acid has donated a proton during a chemical reaction. Hence, a conjugate base is a species formed by the removal of a proton from an acid, as in the reverse reaction it is able to gain a hydrogen ion. Because some acids are capable of releasing multiple protons, the conjugate base of an acid may itself be acidic.

In summary, this can be represented as the following chemical reaction:

Johannes Nicolaus Brønsted and Martin Lowry introduced the Brønsted–Lowry theory, which proposed that any compound that can transfer a proton to any other compound is an acid, and the compound that accepts the proton is a base. A proton is a nuclear particle with a unit positive electrical charge; it is represented by the symbol  because it constitutes the nucleus of a hydrogen atom, that is, a hydrogen cation.

A cation can be a conjugate acid, and an anion can be a conjugate base, depending on which substance is involved and which acid–base theory is the viewpoint. The simplest anion which can be a conjugate base is the solvated electron whose conjugate acid is the atomic hydrogen.

Acid–base reactions
In an acid–base reaction, an acid plus a base reacts to form a conjugate base plus a conjugate acid. The acid loses a proton and the base gains a proton. In chemical diagrams which illustrate this, the new bond formed between the base and the proton is shown by an arrow that conventionally starts on an electron pair from the base and whose arrow-head ends at the hydrogen ion (proton) that will be transferred:

In this case, the water molecule is the conjugate acid of the hydroxide ion after the latter received the hydrogen ion donated by ammonium. On the other hand, ammonia is the conjugate base for the acid ammonium after ammonium has donated a hydrogen ion and produced the water molecule. The terms "acid", "base", "conjugate acid", and "conjugate base" are not fixed for a certain chemical species but are interchangeable according to the reaction taking place.

Strength of conjugates
The strength of a conjugate acid is directly proportional to its dissociation constant. If a conjugate acid is strong, its dissociation will have a higher equilibrium constant and the products of the reaction will be favored. The strength of a conjugate base can be seen as the tendency of the species to "pull" hydrogen protons towards itself. If a conjugate base is classified as strong, it will "hold on" to the hydrogen proton when in solution and its acid will not dissociate.

If a species is classified as a strong acid, its conjugate base will be weak. An example of this case would be the dissociation of hydrochloric acid  in water. Since HCl is a strong acid (it dissociates to a great extent), its conjugate base will be a weak conjugate base. Therefore, in this system, most  will be in the form of a hydronium ion  instead of attached to a Cl− anion and the conjugate base will be weaker than a water molecule.

On the other hand, if a species is classified as a weak acid its conjugate base will not necessarily be a strong base.
In order for a species to have a strong conjugate base it has to be a very weak acid, like water for example.

Identifying conjugate acid–base pairs
To identify the conjugate acid, look for the pair of compounds that are related. The acid–base reaction can be viewed in a before and after sense. The before is the reactant side of the equation, the after is the product side of the equation. The conjugate acid in the after side of an equation gains a hydrogen ion, so in the before side of the equation the compound that has one less hydrogen ion of the conjugate acid is the base. The conjugate base in the after side of the equation lost a hydrogen ion, so in the before side of the equation, the compound that has one more hydrogen ion of the conjugate base is the acid.

Consider the following acid–base reaction:

Nitric acid is an acid because it donates a proton to the water molecule and its conjugate base is nitrate. The water molecule acts as a base because it receives the hydrogen cation (proton) and its conjugate acid is the hydronium ion.

Applications
One use of conjugate acids and bases lies in buffering systems, which include a buffer solution. In a buffer, a weak acid and its conjugate base (in the form of a salt), or a weak base and its conjugate acid, are used in order to limit the pH change during a titration process. Buffers have both organic and non-organic chemical applications. For example, besides buffers being used in lab processes, human blood acts as a buffer to maintain pH. The most important buffer in our bloodstream is the carbonic acid-bicarbonate buffer, which prevents drastic pH changes when  is introduced. This functions as such:
CO2 + H2O <=> H2CO3 <=> HCO3^- + H+

Furthermore, here is a table of common buffers.

A second common application with an organic compound would be the production of a buffer with acetic acid. If acetic acid, a weak acid with the formula , was made into a buffer solution, it would need to be combined with its conjugate base  in the form of a salt. The resulting mixture is called an acetate buffer, consisting of aqueous  and aqueous . Acetic acid, along with many other weak acids, serve as useful components of buffers in different lab settings, each useful within their own pH range.

Ringer's lactate solution is an example where the conjugate base of an organic acid, lactic acid,  is combined with sodium, calcium and potassium cations and chloride anions in distilled water which together form a fluid which is isotonic in relation to human blood and is used for fluid resuscitation after blood loss due to trauma, surgery, or a burn injury.

Table of acids and their conjugate bases
Tabulated below are several examples of acids and their conjugate bases; notice how they differ by just one proton (H+ ion). Acid strength decreases and conjugate base strength increases down the table.

Table of bases and their conjugate acids
In contrast, here is a table of bases and their conjugate acids. Similarly, base strength decreases and conjugate acid strength increases down the table.

See also
 Buffer solution
 Deprotonation
 Protonation
 Salt (chemistry)

References

External links
MCAT General Chemistry Review - 10.4 Titration and Buffers
The Pharmaceutics and Compounding Laboratory - Buffers and Buffer Capacity.

Acid–base chemistry